The 1989 CA-TennisTrophy was a men's tennis tournament played on indoor carpet courts at the Wiener Stadthalle in Vienna, Austria that was part of the 1989 Nabisco Grand Prix. It was the 15th edition of the tournament and took place from 16 October until 23 October 1989. Unseeded Paul Annacone won the singles title.

Finals

Singles

 Paul Annacone defeated  Kelly Evernden 6–7, 6–4, 6–1, 2–6, 6–3
 It was Annacone's 3rd title of the year and the 14th of his career.

Doubles

 Jan Gunnarsson /  Anders Järryd defeated  Paul Annacone /  Kelly Evernden 6–2, 6–3
 It was Gunnarsson's only title of the year and the 9th of his career. It was Järryd's 3rd title of the year and the 45th of his career.

References

External links
 ATP tournament profile
 ITF tournament edition details

 
CA-TennisTrophy
Vienna Open